Sanchai and Sonchat Ratiwatana were the defending champions but lost in the final to Sam Groth and Leander Paes 4–6, 6–1, [10–7].

Seeds

Draw

References
 Main Draw
 Qualifying Draw

Busan Open - Doubles